Valery Aleksandrovich Fadeyev (born 10 October 1960) is Russian journalist and public figure. Former secretary of the Civic Chamber of the Russian Federation.

Biography 
Valery Fadeyev was born in 1960 in Tashkent, now capital of Uzbekistan. After graduating from the Faculty of Management of the Moscow Institute of Physics and Technology in 1983, he served in the strategic missile forces of the USSR. In 1988–90 he worked in the Energy Research Institute of the Soviet Academy of Sciences. In 1993-1995, he was deputy for Yevgeny Yasin as director of the Expert Institute of the Russian Union of Industrialists and Entrepreneurs.

In 1992–95 he worked as an expert, scientific editor of the Kommersant Weekly magazine of the Kommersant publishing house. In 1995–98 Fadeyev was the first deputy editor-in-chief of the Expert Magazine, and subsequently its editor-in-chief from 1998 to 2017. Ivan Davydov, former director of Internet projects development for Expert Magazine, described Fadeyev as "a tragic figure in his own way, who shows what cooperation with the authorities can turn an intelligent and talented person into."

Fadeyev was a member of the Civic Chamber of Russia since its creation in 2005 to 2014. In 2017 he was elected secretary of the 6th composition of this consultative body. He is a member of the Board of Trustees of Oleg Deripaska's charity fund Volnoe Delo. and the director of the Institute of Public Planning. In 2011 Fadeyev became a member of the All-Russia People's Front's Central Council. 

Until November 2019 Valery Fadeyev was a member of the Supreme Council of the United Russia party and deputy coordinator of its liberal platform. In 2016 he lost UR's primary in Komi Republic.

TV presenter 
From October 2014 to June 2016 Fadeyev was the host of "Structure of the Moment" socio-political talk show on Channel One Russia. From September 2016 to June 2018 Fadeyev was the host of Voskresnoye Vremya ("Sunday Time"), the weekly news program of Channel One. Fadeyev left the TV due to his workload in the Civic Chamber. He himself described his work on television as a part-time job.

Views 
In his interview to the magazine "Russian Reporter" after being elected secretary of the Civic Chamber, Fadeyev stated that the activists who are opposing the government are "not our partners." The journalist inquired about the reason for this position, to which Fadeyev replied: "Do not confuse activism with provocation." During the January 2021 protest rallies, Fadeyev said that he does not see the harsh-performed detention of protesters as a violation of human rights.

In 2022, Fadeyev fully supported the Russian invasion of Ukraine.

References

External links
 Информация на сайте Общественной палаты России
  Валерий Фадеев в  гостях у Владимира Познера (2013)

Moscow Institute of Physics and Technology alumni
Russian journalists
Members of the Civic Chamber of the Russian Federation
Business and financial journalists
United Russia politicians
21st-century Russian politicians
Writers from Tashkent
Living people
1960 births
Russian television presenters
Mass media people from Tashkent